Stubblefield Branch is a stream in Oregon County in the Ozarks of southern Missouri. It is a tributary of Mill Creek.

Stubblefield Branch has the name of Joseph Stubblefield, a pioneer citizen.

See also
List of rivers of Missouri

References

Rivers of Oregon County, Missouri
Rivers of Missouri